Money Mad (1934) is a British drama film directed by Frank Richardson and starring Virginia Cherrill, Garry Marsh, and Peter Gawthorne.

Cast
 Virginia Cherrill – Linda
 Garry Marsh – Rutherford
 D. A. Clarke-Smith – Phillips
 Peter Gawthorne – Sir John Leyland
 Helen Haye – Lady Leyland
 Lawrence Anderson – Chauffeur
 Dennis Wyndham – Assistant

References

External links

1934 films
1934 drama films
British drama films
British black-and-white films
Films directed by Frank Richardson
1930s English-language films
1930s British films